Zieria vagans, commonly known as Gurgeena stink bush,<ref name="DES">{{cite web |title=Species profile—Zieria vagans (Gurgeena stink bush) |date = 23 October 2019|url=https://apps.des.qld.gov.au/species-search/details/?id=28217 |publisher=Queensland Government Department Environment and Science |access-date=1 April 2021}}</ref> is a plant in the citrus family Rutaceae and endemic to a small area near Binjour in south-eastern Queensland. It is an open, straggly shrub with densely hairy branches, three-part leaves and groups of up to fifteen flowers with four creamy-white petals and four stamens.

The lower surface of the leaflets is more or less glabrous and the upper surface is rough and has a dense covering of hairs. The flowers are arranged in groups of three to fifteen in leaf axils, the groups shorter than the leaves. There are four stamens.

Taxonomy and namingZieria vagans was first formally described in 2007 by Marco Duretto and Paul Forster from a specimen collected in a state forest near Binjour and the description was published in Austrobaileya. The specific epithet (vagans) is a Latin word meaning "wandering" or "unsettled", referring to some populations of this species growing between woodland and vine thicket.

Distribution and habitat
Gurgeena stink bush is only known from the Gurgeena Plateau near Binjour in the Brigalow Belt bioregions where it grows in or near vine thicket dominated by Backhousia kingii.

Conservation statusZieria vagans is classified as "critically endangered" under the Queensland Government Nature Conservation Act 1992''.

References

vagans
Sapindales of Australia
Flora of Queensland
Plants described in 2007
Taxa named by Marco Duretto
Taxa named by Paul Irwin Forster
Endemic flora of Australia